Parliamentary elections were held in the Federated States of Micronesia on 3 March 2009. As there were no political parties, all 21 candidates ran as independents. Three were returned unopposed.

Electoral system
At the time of the election, Congress consisted of 14 members, of which 10 were elected for two-year terms and four elected for four-year terms. The 2009 elections were for the 10 two-year term seats.

Conduct
The Asia Pacific Democracy Partnership (APDP) was invited to monitor the elections by the Micronesian government. The APDP sent 18 observers, who reported "some irregularities and procedural inconsistencies".

Results

The results from nine constituencies were certified by the National Election Director on 16 March. A recount was ordered for one seat, with the winner confirmed on 24 March.

References

Elections in the Federated States of Micronesia
2009 elections in Oceania
Parliamentary election
Non-partisan elections